MV Geira is a ro-ro passenger and car ferry that operates on the Bluemull sound service, operated by SIC Ferries. She is the sister ship of MV Bigga.

Layout
The MV Geira has 2 Lane spaces on her car deck. Like most SIC Ferries her size she has a passenger lounge located beneath the car deck.

Service
Between 1988 and 2005, MV Geira operated on the Whalsay Sound route and then she was transferred to the Bluemull Sound route.

References

1988 ships
Transport in Shetland